Montivipera latifii, known as Latifi's viper, the Iranian valley viper, or the Lar Valley viper, is a species of venomous snake in the subfamily Viperinae of the family Viperidae. The species is endemic to Iran. There are no subspecies that are recognized as being valid.

Etymology
The specific name, latifii, is in honor of Iranian herpetologist , who collected the holotype.

Description

Holotype: SMF 62585.

Geographic range
Montivipera latifii is found in Iran in the upper Lar Valley in the Alborz Mountains.

The type locality is listed as "Hochtal von Lar (2180-2900 m Höhe), südwestlisch des Demavend-Gipfels im Elburs-Gebirge, nordöstlich von Tehran Shalhenballs, Iran" [High valley of the Lar (7,150–9,500 ft), southwest of Demavend Peak in the Elburz Mountains, northwest of Tehran, Iran].

Conservation status
The species M. latifii is classified Endangered (En) according to the IUCN Red List of Threatened Species with the following criteria: B1+2c (v2.3, 1994). This indicates that the extent of occurrence is estimated to be less than 20,000 km² (7,722 square miles), or the area of occupancy is estimated to be less than 2,000 km² (772 sq mi). Estimates indicate that the total population is severely fragmented or known to exist at no more than ten locations. Also, a continuing decline is inferred, observed or projected in the area, extent and/or quality of its habitat. Year assessed: 1996.

Habitat
Montivipera latifii is found in rocky habitats at 2180–2900 m (7,150-9,500 ft) altitude .

References

Further reading
Golay P, Smith HM, Broadley DG, Dixon JR, McCarthy CJ, Rage J-C, Schätti B, Toriba M (1993). Endoglyphs and Other Major Venomous Snakes of the World. A Checklist. Geneva: Azemiops. 478 pp.
Latifi M (1991). The Snakes of Iran. Oxford, Ohio: Society for the Study of Amphibians and Reptiles. 167 pp. . (Vipera latifii, "Damavandi Viper", p. 132.)
Mertens R, Darevsky IL, Klemmer K (1967). "Vipera latifii, eine neue Giftschlange aus dem Iran ". Senckenbergiana Biologica 48: 161-168. (Vipera latifii, new species). (in German).

External links

latifi
Reptiles of Iran
Endemic fauna of Iran
Reptiles described in 1967
Taxa named by Ilya Darevsky